The Los Angeles Film Critics Association Award for Best Music is one of the annual film awards given by the Los Angeles Film Critics Association.

Notes
°Academy Award for Best Original Score winner
≈Academy Award for Best Original Score nominee
±Academy Award for Best Original Song winner/nominee

Winners

1990s

2000s

2010s

2020s

Multiple winners 

3 Awards
Zbigniew Preisner-(for 7 films)

2 Awards
T-Bone Burnett
Alexandre Desplat-(for 3 films)
Jonny Greenwood
Atticus Ross
Trent Reznor
Howard Shore

References

Film music awards
Los Angeles Film Critics Association Awards